Robert M. McLennan (December 1, 1915 – April 4, 1983) served in the California legislature for the 38th and 63rd District from 1973 to 1976. During World War II he served in the United States Army.

References

External links

United States Army personnel of World War II
1915 births
1983 deaths
Politicians from Shreveport, Louisiana
20th-century American politicians
Republican Party members of the California State Assembly